State Route 363 (SR 363), also known as Indian Creek Road, is a  east-west mile long state highway in Jefferson County, Tennessee. It provides access to lakeside homes and marinas along the south shore of Douglas Lake.

Route description

SR 363 begins at an intersection north of Chestnut Hill at an intersection with SR 92. It goes northeast through farmland before winding its way east through wooded hilly terrain to cross a narrow bridge over Douglas Lake. It winds its way past lakeside homes and marinas before heading southeast through farmland to come to an end at an intersection with US 25W/US 70/SR 9 in Reidtown, just feet from the Cocke County line. The entire route of SR 363 is a narrow two-lane highway traveling along the south shore of Douglas Lake/French Broad River.

Major intersections

References

363
Transportation in Jefferson County, Tennessee